The manga Saint Seiya Episode.G, written and illustrated by Megumu Okada, is a spin-off's side-story and derivative work of Masami Kurumada's Saint Seiya. The story is set seven years before the events of Saint Seiya and depicts the battle of the Gold Saints, ultimate warriors who fight for Peace and Justice in the name of the Goddess Athena, to protect the Earth from the threat of the awakened Titan gods.

The first images of the manga appeared in the Champion Red issue of January 2003, published on November 19, 2002, along with posters by and an interview with Masami Kurumada. The first chapter was then released on the following February issue, published on December 19, 2002, initiating the serialization of the series on this monthly magazine. Chapters were later compiled into volumes by Akita Shoten, with the first being published on June 19, 2003. In July 2009, the manga was put on hiatus, following an unspecified dispute between the author and the publisher. When it resumed in Champion Red'''s April 2011 issue, the magazine released a compilation of past chapters that had not been grouped into volume format yet (chapters 74–76) under the name "Volume 17.5" along with the new chapter. In October 2011, the manga entered a second hiatus, which lasted until April 2013. The final chapter was released on June 19, 2013, and the final volume on August 8, 2013.

In Japan, most volumes have two versions, one a regular version and the other a limited edition, which features different covers and includes various goodies, like drama CDs, postcards, pins, a coin key holder, a day planner, tarot cards, a T-shirt, puzzles, calendars, a pass case and a key chain. Both the regular version and the limited edition contain short special chapters (gaiden), most of which in color, that tell little side-stories or highlight moments from previous chapters.

Between October 2007 and January 2008, Champion Red published a short side-story along with the regular chapters that takes place a few years before the main plot. It details the exploits of Sagittarius Aiolos in Egypt and features a young Aiolia and Galan. The full side-story appears compiled in a special volume called "Volume 0: , released on May 20, 2008, which also contains an encyclopedia with information on all the Episode.G manga published up to that date.Saint Seiya Episode.G has yet to be licensed in English, but it has been translated into other languages and published in several countries outside Japan: in Brazil, by Conrad Editora; by Panini Comics in Italy, Germany and France; Glénat in Spain; Editorial Ivrea in Argentina; Editorial Kamite in Mexico; and by Chuang Yi in Singapore.

In December 2013, Megumu Okada announced via Twitter that he was working on a sequel manga titled Saint Seiya Episode.G: Assassin. Serialization began on April 5, 2014, in the 43rd issue of the bimonthly magazine Champion Red Ichigo. After this magazine ceased publication in August 2014, the series was continued in Akita Shoten's web magazine Champion Cross, later renamed Manga Cross. With the change in venue, the chapters started being published entirely in colour on a biweekly basis. The final chapter was published on August 27, 2019. The chapters were compiled into 16 volumes, some of which include bonus chapters. The first volume was published on October 20, 2014, and the last on December 20, 2019.

A second sequel, the conclusion of the Episode.G series, titled Saint Seiya Episode.G: Requiem, began serialization in January, 2020, on the online manga magazine Manga Cross''.

Volume list

Saint Seiya Episode.G

Saint Seiya Episode.G: Assassin

Saint Seiya Episode.G: Requiem

Chapters not yet in tankōbon format
 Special chapter
 30: 
 31: 
 32: 
 33: 
 34: 
 35: 
 36: 
 37:

Notes

References

Chapters (Saint Seiya Episode.G)